Proyecto Drago is a political party of the Canary Islands created by former Podemos secretary Alberto Rodríguez Rodríguez on 24 October 2022.  The party plans to run for the regional elections in Spain in 2023.

Background 
On 20 January 2021, the Supreme Court of Spain indicted Rodríguez for an alleged crime of attack against authority and misdemeanor or misdemeanor injury for incidents that occurred in 2014. The high court began the procedure once the Congress of Deputies accepted the request requested in December 2020. In October 2021, he was convicted of attacking authority, having to pay a fine of 540 euros in compensation for avoiding imprisonment and being disqualified from holding public office. He was disqualified as a deputy on October 22, 2021, after a few weeks of controversy between the Supreme Court and the Congress of Deputies. On October 23, he announced that he was leaving Podemos.

In January 2023, Rodríguez announced that the party had joined the Más País coalition of left-wing and regionalist parties.

Coalition(s) 
During February 2023 the party formed a coalition comprised by the following parties:

Ideology 
It claims to be a "Canarian obedience" project, which should not depend on any ideology.

References 

Political parties established in 2022
Political parties in the Canary Islands
2022 establishments in Spain